Kevin Zeitler (born March 8, 1990) is an American football guard for the Baltimore Ravens of the National Football League (NFL). He played college football at Wisconsin, and earned consensus All-American honors. He was selected by the Cincinnati Bengals in the first round of the 2012 NFL Draft and he has also played for the Cleveland Browns and New York Giants.

Early years
Zeitler was born in Waukesha, Wisconsin. He attended Wisconsin Lutheran High School in Milwaukee, Wisconsin, and played for Wisconsin Lutheran Vikings high school football team. A three-year letterwinner in football, Zeitler was honored first-team all-conference, first-team all region and second-team all-area as a junior. In his senior year, he gathered first-team all-conference, conference lineman of the year, first-team all region, and first-team all-area honors.

Regarded as a three-star recruit by Rivals.com, Zeitler was ranked the No. 39 offensive guard prospect in his class. Coincidentally, the No. 1 offensive guard in this class was Trevor Robinson, who would later play alongside Zeitler for the Cincinnati Bengals. Having numerous offers, Zeitler narrowed his decision down to Wisconsin and Michigan, before eventually picking the Badgers.

College career
Zeitler attended the University of Wisconsin-Madison, and played for the Wisconsin Badgers football team from 2008 to 2011. He was recognized as a consensus first-team All-American, having been named to the first-teams of the American Football Coaches Association (AFCA), the Associated Press and Pro Football Weekly as a senior in 2011. Zeitler joined teammates Montee Ball and Peter Konz as AFCA All-Americans.

Professional career
Even though "not a nifty or nimble lineman", Zeitler was described as "a solid prospect with the ability to be used in a power running offense." Projected to be a second round selection, Zeitler was ranked No. 4 among guards available in the 2012 NFL Draft by Sports Illustrated. Zeitler himself expected to be a second-rounder, having scheduled a draft-party for Day 2 of the Draft, before being surprised by the Bengals' late first-round selection. Zeitler was the eighth UW offensive lineman taken in the first round of an NFL draft since 1976, after Dennis Lick, Ray Snell, Paul Gruber, Aaron Gibson, Chris McIntosh, Joe Thomas, and Gabe Carimi.

Cincinnati Bengals
In his rookie season, Zeitler started all 16 games at right guard for the Bengals. He gave up only four sacks all season, and graded highest among Bengals linemen.

In his five seasons with the Bengals, Zeitler started 71 of 72 games played at right guard.

Cleveland Browns
On March 9, 2017, Zeitler signed a five-year, $60 million contract with the Cleveland Browns, making him the highest paid guard in the NFL.

New York Giants
On March 13, 2019, the Browns traded Zeitler and Jabrill Peppers to the New York Giants, along with their first and third-round (originally acquired from the New England Patriots) picks in the 2019 NFL Draft, in exchange for Odell Beckham Jr. and Olivier Vernon.

On March 10, 2021, the Giants released Zeitler.

Baltimore Ravens
Zeitler signed a three-year $22.5 million contract with the Baltimore Ravens on March 18, 2021. He had the most fan votes among American Football Conference guards but was not named to the 2023 Pro Bowl AFC roster.

NFL career statistics

References

External links
Wisconsin Badgers bio
New York Giants bio

1990 births
Living people
Sportspeople from Waukesha, Wisconsin
Players of American football from Wisconsin
Wisconsin Badgers football players
All-American college football players
American football offensive guards
Cincinnati Bengals players
Cleveland Browns players
New York Giants players
Baltimore Ravens players
Ed Block Courage Award recipients